Oceania Cruises is a cruise line based in Miami, Florida, that operates six cruise ships on worldwide itineraries. It typically offers cruises that last between 10 and 14 days, but is also known for its long cruises lasting up to 195 days. The line's President and CEO is Bob Binder; he is vice-chairman and also a co-founder of the brand.

Since September 2014, Oceania Cruises has been a wholly owned subsidiary of Norwegian Cruise Line Holdings, which also owns Norwegian Cruise Line and Regent Seven Seas Cruises.

History

Oceania Cruises was founded in 2002. The company chartered the former Renaissance Cruises ship R Two from Cruiseinvest and renamed her Insignia in October 2002. In April 2003 the Insignia was chartered to the French travel agency TRM for three months, during which Oceania Cruises operated no vessels. On 15 June 2003 Oceania Cruises re-commenced service with two ships: Insignia was renamed Regatta and a new ship (R One, a sister ship of Insignia/Regatta, also chartered from Cruiseinvest) entered service as the new Insignia.

In November 2005, a third R-class ship entered service for Oceania Cruises when the company chartered the R Five from Cruiseinvest and renamed her Nautica. At the naming ceremony of the Nautica, Frank del Rio announced the plan of adding a fourth ship, Marina, to the Oceania Cruises fleet in July 2007, but this never came to pass.

In February 2007, the majority of Oceania Cruises' stock was sold to the New York-based private equity firm Apollo Global Management. The following month, Oceania made a memorandum agreement with the Fincantieri shipyard in Italy to construct two new 1,250-passenger ships. The contract was finalized in June 2007, with delivery dates for the new Oceania-class ships set for January 2011 and July 2011. The contract also included an option for a third vessel of the same type that could be delivered in May 2012, but Oceania declined the option.

After being leased out for two years to Hapag-Lloyd as the Columbus 2, the Insignia returned to the fleet in 2014.

In May 2014, it was announced that Oceania and Fincantieri were close to making a deal on two additional ships for the Oceania class. The order for these additional ships never came to fruition.

On September 2, 2014, Norwegian Cruise Line Holdings purchased Prestige Cruise Holdings, the parent company of Oceania Cruises and Regent Seven Seas Cruises, for $3.025 billion.

On November 25, 2014, Norwegian Cruise Line Holdings Ltd announced a definitive agreement with Princess Cruises to purchase the Ocean Princess for Oceania Cruises. Upon delivery in March 2016, the ship underwent a 35-day, $40 million refurbishment in Marseille, France, to become the Sirena.

In August 2018, Oceania Cruises announced its intention to renovate each of its four ships as a part of the $100 million "OceaniaNEXT" program.

On January 8, 2019, Oceania Cruises announced it ordered a new class of ships, the Allura class. The order will consist of two new ships to be built by Fincantieri at a cost of more than $650 million per ship. The ships will be 67,000 gross tons and have a 1,200-passenger capacity. They are scheduled to be delivered in 2022 and 2025.

Fleet

Regatta class

The Regatta-class ships were built in 1998–2000 for Renaissance Cruises as a part of their . They have a gross tonnage of 30,277 and can accommodate a maximum of 824 passengers in 343 cabins.

Oceania class
The Oceania class consists of two 1,250-passenger, 66,084-gross ton ships built by Fincantieri in Italy, with the first, delivered in January 2011, and the second, delivered in May 2012. These were the first ships built for Oceania. On these vessels 580 of the 625 cabins and suites have private balconies.

Allura class
In January 2019, two 1,200-passenger, 67,000-gross ton ships were ordered from Fincantieri, with the first to be delivered in 2023 and the second to be delivered in 2025.

See also
 Regent Seven Seas Cruises
 Seabourn Cruise Line
 Silversea Cruises

References

External links

Official website

Apollo Global Management companies
Cruise lines
Transport companies established in 2002
Private equity portfolio companies
Norwegian Cruise Line